Aleksandar Radulović may refer to:

 Aleksandar Radulović (basketball, born 1984), Montenegrin basketball player for Kožuv
 Aleksandar Radulović (basketball, born 1988), Serbian basketball player for Borac Čačak